Drivers Wanted is a 2005 comedy film written, directed and produced by T. Lee Beideck. Beideck also stars in the film, along with David Sirk, Amaury Batista, Dave Spiecher and Brian Osborne.

The plot is centered on the pizza delivery drivers for a small town pizza shop.

External links
Official Website

See also
 List of American films of 2005
Pizza delivery in popular culture

2005 films
2005 comedy films
American comedy films
2000s English-language films
2000s American films